Elwell Stephen Otis (March 25, 1838 – October 21, 1909) was a United States Army general who served in the American Civil War, Indian Wars, the Philippines late in the Spanish–American War and during the Philippine–American War.

Biography
Otis was born in Frederick, Maryland on March 25, 1838. He attended the University of Rochester, where he was a member of the Iota chapter of St. Anthony Hall aka the Fraternity of Delta Psi. He graduated from Harvard Law School in 1860 and was practicing law during the first year of the Civil War.

Civil War
During the American Civil War, Otis was appointed captain in the 140th New York Volunteer Infantry Regiment formed in Rochester, NY in September 1862. He fought at the battles of Fredericksburg, Chancellorsville and Gettysburg. On December 23, 1863, he was promoted to lieutenant colonel of his regiment. At the Battle of Spotsylvania the regiment's colonel was killed and Otis assumed command. He fought in all the battles of the Overland Campaign. During the Siege of Petersburg, he assumed command of the 1st Brigade, 2nd Division in V Corps leading it into action at the Battle of Peebles' Farm. During this battle he was severely wounded effectively ended his field career during the Civil War. He was promoted to brevet brigadier general of volunteers for actions at Peebles' Farm. Otis eventually recovered and was appointed lieutenant colonel of the 22nd U.S. Infantry in 1867.

Indian Wars
Otis continued serving in the army during the Indian Wars as part of the 22nd U.S. including campaigning in Montana in the aftermath of the Battle of the Little Bighorn. On February 8, 1880, he was appointed colonel of the 20th U.S. Infantry. On November 28, 1893, he was appointed brigadier general in the regular army. He later commanded the Department of the Columbia and the Department of Colorado.

Philippine–American War
On May 4, 1898, he was appointed major general of volunteers and was sent to the Philippines with reinforcements for General Wesley Merritt. Otis assumed command of the Eighth Army Corps, replacing Merritt, who had become the military governor of the Philippines. Merritt served as military governor only briefly before he returned to the United States. On August 28, 1898, Otis was appointed Military Governor for the Philippines.

He also continued in command of Eighth Corps during the Philippine–American War. He conducted the U.S. Army during the Battle of Manila in 1899 and during the first phase of the insurrection before fighting turned primarily to guerrilla warfare.

Otis's response when Emilio Aguinaldo tried to stop the war by sending an emissary to General Otis to appeal for an end to the fighting in the Second Battle of Manila was, "fighting, having begun, must go on to the grim end."

Soldiers under Otis' command were accused of committing abuses early in the war. In response to these charges, Otis said:

The conduct of the Washington Volunteers has been the subject of special investigations for some time. They deny wanton burning or cruelties. And still there are strong indications that they practised these infractions to some extent.

Later life
He was relieved of command in 1900 and replaced by Arthur MacArthur Jr., the father of Douglas MacArthur. He returned to the United States and commanded the Department of the Lakes. He was appointed major general in the regular army in 1906.

Otis was a skilled general and able administrator. However, he was generally disliked by his subordinates and peers and received harsh treatment in the press. He was known as "Granny" by his troops because of his age and graying hair.  On the other hand, Rudolph Rau writes of Otis' work in the Philippines that "He delegated no authority, was pompous and fuzzy, and inspired few". He died in Rochester, New York on October 21, 1909, from painful angina.

Family
Elwell S. Otis married twice. His first wife was Louise Selden.  They married in 1870, and had two daughters:
 Laura Lu Otis born 1872 in North Dakota. Married Harry K. Elston.
 Mary L. Otis born 1875 in New York. Married Ralph Isham.
His second wife was Louisa  Bowman, the daughter of Alexander Hamilton Bowman and Marie Louisa Collins. The couple had one child. They were married in 1878.
 Louise B. Otis born February 21, 1882, in Kansas and died December 27, 1963, in Santa Barbara, California. She married George Wagner.

Louisa "Lulu" Otis, the widow of Elwell Otis died in Santa Barbara, California on June 8, 1934.

Legacy
For many years on June 15, Rochester, New York celebrated Otis Day. This is no longer the case.

Portrayal in the media
 Portrayed by E.A. Rocha in the Philippine film, Heneral Luna (2015), and its sequel, Goyo: Ang Batang Heneral (2018).

See also

References

Further reading
  Full book online

1838 births
1909 deaths
American military personnel of the Philippine–American War
American military personnel of the Spanish–American War
Burials at Arlington National Cemetery
Otis family
Politicians from Frederick, Maryland
People of New York (state) in the American Civil War
Union Army officers
United States Army generals
United States military governors
Harvard Law School alumni
Military Governors of the Philippine Islands
University of Rochester alumni
19th-century American businesspeople